Neuss Am Kaiser station is a station in the district of Barbaraviertel of the city of Neuss in the German state of North Rhine-Westphalia.  It is on the Mönchengladbach–Düsseldorf railway and it is classified by Deutsche Bahn as a category 5 station. The station opened on 29 May 1988 on the new line built with the Hamm railway bridge opened by the Bergisch-Märkische Railway Company on 24 July 1870.

The station is served by three lines of the Rhine-Ruhr S-Bahn, S 8 (running between Hagen and Mönchengladbach), S 11 (running between Düsseldorf Airport and Bergisch Gladbach) and S 28 (running between Mettmann Stadtwald or Wuppertal and Kaarster See), each operating every 20 minutes during the day.

It is also served by Düsseldorf Stadtbahn line route U 75, operated at 10-minute intervals, and by bus routes 830, operated by Rheinbahn at 20-minute intervals, and 864, operated by Busverkehr Rheinland at 60-minute intervals.

References

Footnotes

Sources

Rhine-Ruhr S-Bahn stations
S8 (Rhine-Ruhr S-Bahn)
S11 (Rhine-Ruhr S-Bahn)
S28 (Rhine-Ruhr S-Bahn)
Neuss
Buildings and structures in Rhein-Kreis Neuss
Railway stations in Germany opened in 1988